The 2006 Challenge Cup (also known as the Powergen Challenge Cup due to sponsorship from Powergen) was the 105th tournament played for rugby league's Challenge Cup. It features teams from across Europe including England, Scotland, Wales, France and Russia.

The competition started in January 2006 with the preliminary round where the Gloucestershire Warriors from the Rugby League Conference surprised an established Pennine League team in Illingworth. The final was scheduled to be played at the new Wembley Stadium but in March 2006 it became apparent that the stadium would not be ready for the final on 26 August so it was switched to Twickenham.

In the final St. Helens proved too strong for the Huddersfield Giants, winning by 42 points to 12. It was Huddersfield's first final since 1953, when they also faced St Helens.

Round 1
(week ending 5 February)

Sees the introduction of the major amateur clubs from the National Conference League and the teams from National League 3

Round 2
(week ending 19 February)

Round 3
(week ending 12 March)

Round 3 sees the introduction of the National League 1 and 2 teams and teams from France and Russia. Amateurs Thornhill Trojans provided the first surprise result by beating national 2 team Workington Town. Late season snow caused a number of postponements on the Sunday.

Round 4
(week ending 2 April)

Round 4 sees the introduction of the Super League teams. Some matches are now televised live by the BBC. In this round the matches chosen for transmission were at Bradford and Wakefield.

Round 5
(week ending 21 May)

No new teams enter at this stage. In this round the matches chosen for transmission were at St Helens and Widnes.

Quarter-finals
(week ending 4 June)

In this round the matches chosen for transmission were at Hull KR and Leeds. Hull KR pulled off a major surprise when they beat Superleague team Warrington Wolves.

Semi-finals
(week ending 30 July)

Unlike earlier rounds, matches from now on will be played on neutral grounds. Huddersfield have the chance to win the Cup for the first time in 1953 when they beat this year's final opponents St Helens.

Final

The final was originally scheduled to be played at Wembley Stadium though because of the construction delay was alternatively held at Twickenham Stadium, London.

Teams:

St Helens: Paul Wellens, Ade Gardner, Jamie Lyon, Willie Talau, Francis Meli; Leon Pryce, Sean Long, Paul Anderson, Keiron Cunningham, Jason Cayless, Jon Wilkin, Paul Sculthorpe, Jason Hooper
Subs: Lee Gilmour, James Roby, James Graham, Maurie Fa'asavalu Coach: Daniel Anderson

Huddersfield: Paul Reilly, Martin Aspinwall, Stephen Wild, Michael De Vere, Stuart Donlan, Chris Thorman (c), Robbie Paul, Paul Jackson, Brad Drew, Jim Gannon, Chris Nero, Andy Raleigh, Stuart Jones
Subs: Paul Smith, Eorl Crabtree, Steve Snitch, Wayne McDonald   Coach: Jon Sharp

UK Broadcasting rights
The tournament was screened in the United Kingdom by the BBC.

External links
Rugby Football League
Powergen Challenge Cup 2006 on BBC.co.uk
2006 Challenge Cup Final at rlphotos.com

Challenge Cup
St Helens R.F.C.
Challenge Cup
Challenge Cup
Challenge Cup
Challenge Cup
Challenge Cup
Challenge Cup